In mathematics, a binary relation  on a set  is antisymmetric if there is no pair of distinct elements of  each of which is related by  to the other. More formally,  is antisymmetric precisely if for all 

or equivalently,

The definition of antisymmetry says nothing about whether  actually holds or not for any . An antisymmetric relation  on a set  may be reflexive (that is,  for all ), irreflexive (that is,  for no ), or neither reflexive nor irreflexive. A relation is asymmetric if and only if it is both antisymmetric and irreflexive.

Examples 

The divisibility relation on the natural numbers is an important example of an antisymmetric relation.

The usual order relation  on the real numbers is antisymmetric: if for two real numbers  and  both inequalities  and  hold, then  and  must be equal.

A real-life example of a relation that is typically antisymmetric is "paid the restaurant bill of" (understood as restricted to a given occasion). Typically, some people pay their own bills, while others pay for their spouses or friends. As long as no two people pay each other's bills, the relation is antisymmetric.

Properties 

Partial and total orders are antisymmetric by definition. A relation can be both symmetric and antisymmetric (in this case, it must be coreflexive), and there are relations which are neither symmetric nor antisymmetric (for example, the "preys on" relation on biological species).

Antisymmetry is different from asymmetry: a relation is asymmetric if and only if it is antisymmetric and irreflexive.

See also 

 
 Symmetry in mathematics

References 

 
 
 nLab antisymmetric relation

Binary relations